Scot Alan Marciel (born 1958) is an American diplomat and served as Principal Deputy Assistant Secretary in the Bureau of East Asian and Pacific Affairs until February 2016. He was confirmed by the U.S. Senate to be the United States Ambassador to Burma on January 28, 2016.

He was the United States Ambassador to Indonesia from August 2010 until July 2013.  Marciel has worked for the United States Department of State since 1985. He has served in various capacities abroad and in particular was the United States Ambassador to the Association of Southeast Asian Nations prior to his nomination in Indonesia.

Marciel grew up in Fremont, California. He is a graduate of the University of California, Davis and the Fletcher School of Law and Diplomacy.

Diplomatic career
Ambassador Marciel previously served as Deputy Assistant Secretary, East Asia and Pacific Bureau, responsible for relations with Southeast Asia, and as Ambassador for ASEAN Affairs.

Marciel, a career member of the Senior Foreign Service, joined the State Department in 1985. His assignments included Director of the Department's Office of Maritime Southeast Asia, Director of the Office of Mainland Southeast Asia, and Director of the Office of Southeastern Europe. He has served in Indonesia, Vietnam, the Philippines, Hong Kong, Brazil and Turkey, as well as in the Economic Bureau's Office of Monetary Affairs.

References

External links

|-

|-

1958 births
Ambassadors of the United States to Indonesia
Ambassadors of the United States to Myanmar
Ambassadors of the United States to ASEAN
Living people
People from Fremont, California
Date of birth missing (living people)
Place of birth missing (living people)
The Fletcher School at Tufts University alumni
University of California, Davis alumni
United States Foreign Service personnel
21st-century American diplomats